Roseville Area Schools the school district of Roseville, Minnesota. It is also known as Independent School District 623.

Schools
Roseville Area High School
Roseville Area Middle School
Brimhall Elementary School
Central Park Elementary School
Edgerton Elementary School
Emmet D. Williams Elementary School
Falcon Heights Elementary School
Harambee Elementary School
Little Canada Elementary School
Parkview Center School
Fairview Community Center (Fairview Alternative High School)

External links
 Independent School District 623 - Roseville Area Schools website

School districts in Minnesota
Education in Ramsey County, Minnesota
Roseville, Minnesota